Andrey Lvovich Kursanov (8 November 1902 – 20 September 1999) was a Soviet specialist on the physiology and biochemistry of plants. He was an academician of the Soviet and Russian Academies of Sciences since 1953. He was a member of the Presidium of the Academy of Sciences of the Soviet Union in 1957–1963.

Kursanov graduated from Moscow State University in 1926. He was awarded the degree of Doctor of Sciences in biology in 1940 and became a professor at his alma mater in 1944. In 1954, Kursanov and Boris Rybakov represented the Soviet Academy of Sciences at the Columbia University Bicentennial in New York City.

Professor Kursanov was awarded a number of honorary doctorates and was an honorary member of a number of foreign scientific societies and academies. He was elected a foreign fellow of the American Academy of Arts and Sciences in 1962 and member of the Polish Academy of Sciences in 1965.

Awards and honors
Hero of Socialist Labour (1969)
Order of Lenin, four times (1953, 1969, 1972, 1975)
Order of the October Revolution (1982)
Order of the Red Banner of Labour, twice (1945, 1962)
Lomonosov Gold Medal (1983)

References

1902 births
1999 deaths
Scientists from Moscow
Academic staff of Moscow State Pedagogical University
Academicians of the Russian Academy of Agriculture Sciences
Academicians of the VASKhNIL
Fellows of the American Academy of Arts and Sciences
Full Members of the Russian Academy of Sciences
Full Members of the USSR Academy of Sciences
Members of the German Academy of Sciences Leopoldina
Members of the Polish Academy of Sciences
Moscow State University alumni
Heroes of Socialist Labour
Recipients of the Lomonosov Gold Medal
Recipients of the Order of Lenin
Recipients of the Order of the Red Banner of Labour
Plant physiologists
Russian biochemists
Soviet biochemists

Burials at Novodevichy Cemetery